Tarun Agarwala (born 3 March 1956) is an Indian Judge and former Chief Justice of Meghalaya High Court.

Career
Agarwala passed Law from the University of Allahabad. In 1981 he started practice on Civil, Constitutional and Taxation matters in Allahabad High Court. He became a Permanent Judge of the Allahabad High Court on 18 August 2005. Justice Agarwala was transferred to Uttarakhand High Court in 2009 and served there as acting Chief Justice. He was elevated to the post of Chief Justice of Meghalaya High Court on 12 February 2018. After retirement Agarwal was appointed by Securities and Exchange Board of India as the presiding officer of Securities Appellate Tribunal, Mumbai.

References

1956 births
Living people
Indian judges
Chief Justices of the Meghalaya High Court
University of Allahabad alumni
21st-century Indian judges
Judges of the Allahabad High Court
Justices of the Uttarakhand High Court